Russia participated in the Eurovision Song Contest 2008 in Belgrade, Serbia. The Russian entry was selected through a national final, Evrovidenie 2008 (Евровидение 2008) organised by the Russian broadcaster Rossiya Channel (RTR). Dima Bilan represented Russia with the song "Believe", which qualified from the first semi-final of the competition and won the contest, placing 1st in the final with 272 points.

Before Eurovision

Evrovidenie 2008 

Evrovidenie 2008 was the fourth edition of Evrovidenie, the music competition that selects Russia's entry for the Eurovision Song Contest. The show took place on 9 March 2008 at the Akademicheskiy Concert Hall in Moscow and hosted by Oxana Fedorova and Oskar Kuchera. Twenty-seven artists and songs participated and the winner was selected through a jury and a public televote. The show was broadcast on Russia-1, RTR-Planeta as well as online via the broadcaster's website rfn.ru.

Competing entries 
On 8 December 2007, RTR announced a submission period for interested artists and composers to submit their entries between 15 December 2007 and 1 February 2008. The broadcaster received 167 submissions at the conclusion of the deadline. A jury panel evaluated the received submissions and selected the twenty-five finalists for the national final. The competing acts alongside an additional two finalists were announced on 4 March 2008 and among the competing artists were 2002 Russian Eurovision entrants Premyer-Ministr, 2006 Russian Eurovision entrant Dima Bilan, and 2006 Belarusian Eurovision entrant Polina Smolova. 

A documentary programme about the Eurovision Song Contest was produced and aired on Russia-1 in the lead up to the national final, while Muz-TV and Love Radio presented the finalists to the public and covered the preparations of the national final.

Final 
The final took place on 9 March 2008. Twenty-seven entries competed and the winner, "Believe" performed by Dima Bilan, was determined through a 50/50 combination of votes from a jury panel and public televoting. The jury consisted of Igor Krutoy (composer), Sergey Arhipov (deputy director of Radio Mayak), Maxim Fadeev (composer and producer), Gennady Gokhshtein (executive entertainment producer of Russia-1) and Vladimir Matetsky (singer-songwriter and producer). In addition to the performances of the competing entries, Eurovision Song Contest 2007 winner Marija Šerifović, 2008 Belarusian Eurovision entrant Ruslan Alekhno and 2008 Ukrainian Eurovision entrant Ani Lorak performed as guests.

At Eurovision

With changes to the format of the Eurovision Song Contest coming into effect in 2008, Russia was required to compete in one of two semi-finals in order to qualify to compete in the final. In the allocation draw on 28 January 2008, Russia was drawn to compete in the first semi-final on 20 May 2008. On 17 March 2008 during the draw for running order, Russia was drawn to receive the third of three wildcards for the first semi-final, allowing the Russian head of delegation to select the starting position for the nation. Russia chose to perform 18th in the first semifinal, following Romania and preceding Greece.

Bilan was joined on stage by figure skater Evgeni Plushenko, who performed on a mobile ice rink placed on stage specifically for the Russian performance, and violinist Edvin Marton, who performed with a Stradivarius. Russia qualified from the first semi-final, placing 3rd and scoring 135 points. During the winners' press conference following the conclusion of the first semi-final broadcast, Russia was drawn to perform 24th in the final following Serbia and preceding Norway. Russia won the 2008 Contest placing 1st and scoring 272 points. As the winning nation of the 2008 Contest and the host of the forthcoming contest, Russia pre-qualified to compete in the final of the Eurovision Song Contest 2009.

The first semi-final and final were broadcast on Telekanal Rossiya, with commentary by Dmitriy Guberniyev and Olga Shelest. The voting spokesperson for Russia was Oxana Fedorova.

Voting

Points awarded to Russia

Points awarded by Russia

References

2008
Countries in the Eurovision Song Contest 2008
Eurovision